Slash/Back is a 2022 Canadian Inuit science fiction film directed by Nyla Innuksuk in her feature debut from a screenplay by Innuksuk and Ryan Cavan. It premiered at the 2022 South by Southwest Festival in Texas.

Cast

Production

The concept for Slash/Back was first presented at the 2018 Frontières Co-Pro Market in Montréal, followed by the 2019 Frontières Finance and Packaging Forum in Helsinki and then the Marché du Film at the Cannes Film Festival, after which point Sierra/Affinity boarded the project as an international distributor.

Principal photography took place on location on Baffin Island in summer 2019. It became the first production to film in the Inuit hamlet of Pangnirtung. The area was already experiencing a housing shortage so production flew in fifty beds and set up accommodation for the crews in two local schools. Acting workshops were setup to find local girls to star in the film.

Release
A first look still was revealed in March 2021.

Slash/Back premiered at the 2022 South by Southwest Festival in Texas. In Canada, it was the opening night film at the TIFF Next Wave Film Festival.

On October 21, 2022, it was released in selected theatres and to video on demand service Vudu.

Critical response
On the review aggregator website Rotten Tomatoes, the film received a 92% approval rating, based on 49 reviews, with an average rating of 6.8/10. The website's consensus reads, "An impressive feature debut for director/co-writer Nyla Innuksuk, Slash/Back puts a refreshing spin on the standard alien invasion thriller." On Metacritic, the film has a score of 67 out of 100, based on reviews from 11 critics, indicating "generally favorable reviews".

Barry Hertz of The Globe and Mail wrote that "the moments between can be rough, the result of a script whose last two acts can't reach the heights of its enticing conceit, a choppy sense of pacing that speeds up when it should slow down and vice versa, an amateur cast whose rawness is at odds with the story that they are enlisted with telling, and a no-frills visual-effects budget that robs the film of its central creature-feature thrills. There is, though, so much promise in every chilly inch of Innuksuk's vision, starting with her film’s firm sense of place – the director grew up in Nunavut, dreaming of darkness even when sunlight was 24/7 – and extending to how the director continues horror’s long tradition of sneaking in heavy themes that audiences might otherwise not so readily shoulder."

Awards
The film was shortlisted for the Directors Guild of Canada's 2022 Jean-Marc Vallée DGC Discovery Award.

References

External links
 
 Slash/Back at Library and Archives Canada

Alien invasions in films
Canadian science fiction adventure films
Films about Inuit in Canada
Films set in Nunavut
Films shot in Nunavut
2022 films
2022 science fiction films
2020s Canadian films